The Phantom Stranger is a superhero appearing in American comic books published by DC Comics, of unspecified paranormal origins, who battles mysterious and occult forces, sometimes under their Vertigo imprint. The character first appeared in an eponymous comics anthology published in August/September 1952.

The Phantom Stranger made his first live appearance in the 2019 television series Swamp Thing for the DC streaming service played by Macon Blair.

Publication history
The Phantom Stranger first appeared in an eponymous six-issue comics anthology published in 1952 and created by John Broome and Carmine Infantino. After an appearance in Showcase #80 (February 1969), he received another series beginning May–June 1969 that lasted until February–March 1976.

The Showcase appearance and the first three issues of Phantom Stranger consisted of reprints from both the 1950s title and the "Dr. 13: Ghost-Breaker" feature from the last nine issues of Star Spangled Comics at the same time, with new, brief framing sequences. These had Dr. Thirteen, certain that the Phantom Stranger was an impostor, determined to expose him.

Beginning with issue #4 (November–December 1969), the series began featuring all-new material, with stories produced by Robert Kanigher, Len Wein, Jim Aparo, Neal Adams, Tony DeZuniga and others. In these stories, while the Stranger's past remained a mystery, the writers added a semi-regular cast of characters for him. A demonic sorceress named Tala would become his archenemy; an alchemist/sorcerer named Tannarak was first an enemy and would later assist him against the Dark Circle; and a blind psychic named Cassandra Craft would assist him. The stories hinted at a romantic attraction between the Stranger and Craft, but he eventually left her, deciding she could not be part of his life, convincing her he had been killed in their final battle against the Dark Circle. She eventually learned differently and turned up occasionally. Doctor Thirteen, dropped along with the reprints, was given a back-up series here as of #12 (March–April 1971) which morphed into "The Spawn of Frankenstein" in #23 (January–February 1973).

The Phantom Stranger is better known for his role as a supernatural assistant to other heroes, such as the Justice League. His status as either a full, reserve, or honorary member of the League is debatable. After a vote of the majority of the team in Justice League of America #103, they offered him membership, with Superman declaring the Stranger "a member" without qualification, though he left before accepting. This issue was part of an unofficial metafictional crossover with Marvel Comics, spanning titles from both of the major comics companies. Beginning in Marvel's Amazing Adventures #16 (by Steve Englehart with art by Bob Brown and Frank McLaughlin), the story continued in DC's Justice League of America #103 (by Len Wein, Dick Dillin and Dick Giordano), and is concluded in Thor #207 (by Gerry Conway and penciler John Buscema). Each comic featured writers Steve Englehart, Gerry Conway, and Len Wein, as well as Wein's first wife Glynis, interacting with Marvel or DC characters at the Rutland Halloween Parade in Rutland, Vermont. The Phantom Stranger has at least twice asserted his membership status when other Leaguers challenged his input, during the vote on the League's re-admission of Wonder Woman and during the crossover with The Avengers. In contrast, many in-story accounts of League membership fail to include the Stranger; when Zatanna was admitted as a member, Superman and Hawkman clarified that the 12-member limit in the League's charter had been rewritten previously to admit Hawkgirl as the 13th. Writer Len Wein commented on the Phantom Stranger's relationship with the JLA in a 2012 interview stating that the character "only sort of joined. He was offered membership but vanished, as per usual, without actually accepting the offer. Over the years, other writers have just assumed [he] was a member, but in my world, he never really said yes".

The Stranger also starred in a miniseries in 1987. This series portrayed him as an agent of the Lords of Order. They temporarily stripped the Stranger of his powers, due to his desire to continue a battle against the Lords of Chaos. This went against the wishes of the Lords of Order, who had believed a victory by darkness over light was necessary and preordained. This series featured Eclipso as an agent of Chaos; in Green Lantern/Superman: Legend of the Green Flame, this role is continued, but the Stranger claims that he belongs to no group. The Lords of Order threaten to strip him of his powers, and he leaves, claiming that he shall continue to wander.

A forty-second issue was added to the second series during the Blackest Night event, effectively a one-shot.

The Phantom Stranger received a new ongoing series in September 2012 written by Dan DiDio and drawn by Brent Anderson. This series was retitled as Trinity of Sin: The Phantom Stranger as of issue #9 (Aug. 2013) and cancelled as of #22 (Oct. 2014).

Fictional character biography

Origin
Unusual for a comic book character of such longevity, nothing in the way of personal data about the Phantom Stranger—his real name, his true nature, or his origins—has ever been revealed. In 1987, DC produced a special issue of Secret Origins (Vol. 2, #10) that postulated four possible origins:
In a variation of the Wandering Jew story, he was a man named Isaac with a wife (Rebecca) and a young son in Bethlehem during the time of Jesus' childhood. When King Herod heard that there was born a child who would be king of the Jews, he orders the Massacre of the Innocents in order to kill the Christ Child. Among the people killed were Isaac's wife and son. Blind with anger, he spends the next 30 years raging against Jesus. During the Passion of Jesus, Isaac bribes a guard to let him take his place and participate in the flagellation of Christ. Jesus condemns Isaac to "tarry in this world - until I come again". Centuries after the crucifixion, Isaac repents. He has spent his life helping mankind ever since, evidently finding the task so agreeably fulfilling that in the present day (i.e., the late 1980s) he politely declines an offer from God to release him from his penance.
The Stranger was a man in Biblical times who was spared God's wrath by an angel. Questioning God's actions, he commits suicide. The angel forbids his spirit from entering the afterlife, reanimates his body and condemns him to walk the world forever as part of humanity, but also forever separated from it. The angel also erases all of the man's memories of his past life. He then discovers his divine charge: to turn humanity away from evil, one soul at a time. Some versions of this story imply that the angel was the incarnation of the Spectre of that time period.
The Phantom Stranger is a being caught in a time loop. Near the end of the universe, the Phantom Stranger approaches a group of scientists who are trying to transfer energy from the Big Bang to extend the life of the universe. The Phantom Stranger realizes that one of the scientists is in reality an Avatar of Anti-Life, and that their efforts will prevent the universe from ever existing. The story concludes with the Phantom Stranger passing a portion of himself to a scientist, who dives through the portal to the Big Bang, intercepts the beam that would have drained the Big Bang, and becomes the Phantom Stranger, completing the cycle.
The Phantom Stranger was a fallen angel who sided with neither Heaven nor Hell during Lucifer's rebellion and thus was condemned to walk the Earth alone for all time. In the comic book miniseries The Trenchcoat Brigade, John Constantine sees that the fourth origin story is essentially correct. Vertigo Visions: Phantom Stranger #1 by Alisa Kwitney and Guy Davis builds upon Alan Moore's fallen angel story from Secret Origins and adds the story of a woman called Naamah, who was condemned to Hell for loving an angel. This angel is strongly hinted to have become the Phantom Stranger.

Another possible origin was hinted at in The Kingdom (the sequel to Kingdom Come) in which it was implied that Jonathan Kent, the future son of Superman and Wonder Woman, might grow up to be the Phantom Stranger. This also tied some of his abilities into the Hypertime concept, giving him the innate ability to enter alternate timelines and to exist in the spaces between them. The story ultimately revealed this to be a red herring. The character in question had been deliberately drawn in shadows to suggest that he was the Stranger; but when Wonder Woman finally saw his face, she said that she now realized he was not the Stranger they knew.

His appearances in titles featuring Doctor Fate reveal that the Stranger was a servant of the Lords of Order during the Ninth Age of Magic (at least). This may be a later development unrelated to his actual origin.

In Phantom Stranger (vol. 4) #0 (2012), the Phantom Stranger is Judas Iscariot. He is judged by the Circle of Eternity, who are implied to be proxies for a higher power. The Stranger is condemned to walk the Earth forever as an agent of God. He wears a necklace made of the 30 pieces of silver which he took as payment for betraying Jesus. When the Stranger facilitates the transformation of Jim Corrigan into the Spectre, one of the coins falls from the necklace and crumbles, bringing him one step closer to redemption.

Depictions by different writers

In his earliest appearances, the Phantom Stranger would prove supernatural events to be hoaxes perpetrated by criminals. He would directly confront the villains, and displayed no supernatural abilities apart perhaps from his uncanny ability to appear where and when he is needed and to disappear just as mysteriously, with nobody seeing him coming or going. In later stories, the supernatural events were real and the Phantom Stranger was given unspecified supernatural powers of his own to defeat them. For example, he was able to control a smoke-based sedative with a gesture, claiming that smoke itself is his ally.

In his second comic book series, the Phantom Stranger became a truly supernatural hero.

The Phantom Stranger played a major part in Neil Gaiman's The Books of Magic, taking protagonist Tim Hunter through time to show him the history and nature of magic. He has assisted the Justice League on numerous occasions, even being formally elected to the group in Justice League of America #103, although he did not acknowledge his membership until Justice League of America #143. The Stranger also had his own limited series, where, lacking much of his power, he tries to foil Eclipso's plan to cause a nuclear war.

During Kevin Smith's relaunch of Green Arrow, he prevented Hal Jordan from uniting the resurrected body of Oliver Queen with his soul in Heaven. This earned him Jordan's wrath; indeed, the Spectre threatened to judge the Stranger to see whether God had "punished" him properly by refusing him access to Heaven itself. Nonetheless, the Phantom Stranger assisted Hal Jordan during his tenure as the Spectre on numerous occasions as well, most notably in a short stint babysitting Hal's niece, Helen.

In 2005's Day of Vengeance, the Phantom Stranger had been turned into a mouse by the Spectre. Upon the Spectre's confrontation and battle with the Stranger, the Stranger states: "You can't kill me. I doubt that the Universe would allow it". He was still able to advise Detective Chimp, however, who sheltered him in his hat while he regained his powers. He changed back using recovered energies in Day of Vengeance #6 and aided the Shadowpact, allowing them to see the battle between the Spectre and Shazam. The series makes a point that the supernatural community generally regards the Phantom Stranger as invincible. The first reaction of some characters to the Spectre's assault on magic is simply to presume that the Stranger will take care of it. Other stories have shown the Stranger to be nearly as powerful as the Spectre.

In Day of Vengeance: Infinite Crisis Special #1, the Phantom Stranger works with Nabu, Doctor Occult, Zatanna, the Shadowpact, and other mystics to re-form the Rock of Eternity and help defeat the maddened Spectre.

The Phantom Stranger's relationships with the other mystic heroes are usually a bit tense. The Stranger has no qualms gathering various forces in order to combat a certain evil (the Sentinels of Magic, but also other loose outfits), often invading those people's personal lives. However, he does not usually extend them that same courtesy. The Phantom Stranger has resisted such people as Doctor Fate (notably Hector Hall) in this, although Doctor Fate is, in almost any incarnation, an ally of the Stranger. Despite this, he does get along well with Zatanna; in Justice League of America #6, he appeared by her side to help remove the influence of Faust on the Red Tornado, and in the Justice series he seems to have a fatherly affection for her, calling her "my dear".

Since he is ultimately an unpredictable force, others often meet the Phantom Stranger's appearance with distrust. Nonetheless, most heroes will follow him, seeing not only his immense power, but also knowing that the Stranger is, in the end, a force for good. He has generally shown to side with humanity first in many supernatural-based problems, such as when he aided Superman in a confrontation with the magician Arion, who attempted to force Superman to retire in the belief that Superman and other alien heroes would hold back the 'darkness' that would make civilization—Arion describing human history as existing in a cycle that would allow humanity to develop to a certain point before they collapsed and had to start again—for so long that it would destroy humanity when it came; although the Stranger acknowledged that the future Arion had foreseen, where Earth was completely destroyed by the mysterious and powerful Khyber due to Superman delaying him for so long that he only struck at his peak, was possible, he also told Superman to keep fighting to find another way as the cost in souls and experience if Arion succeeded would be too great. A notable exception to the heroes who will work with the Stranger is Madame Xanadu, who has refused to join the Stranger on a few occasions, although she is a member of his Sentinels of Magic. Eventually, it was revealed that Madame Xanadu's hatred for the Phantom Stranger stems from his involvement in the events costing young Nimue her powers and heritage, and turning the young fey into the immortal yet powerless clairvoyant.

The Stranger also holds a unique relationship with the Spectre, as the two forces often come into conflict. He was responsible for gathering a group of mystic heroes in order to combat the Spectre, when its human host Jim Corrigan seemingly lost control of the Spectre (it was during this time that they destroyed the country of Vlatava). The Phantom Stranger participated in Jim Corrigan's funeral, when Corrigan's soul finally earned its rest and left the Spectre. The Stranger subsequently became one of the forces that stood against the Spectre when it went on a rampage without its human host, until the soul of Hal Jordan bonded with it. The Stranger occasionally took on an advisory role for this new Spectre. In Infinite Crisis #6, aware that the Spectre now has yet another new host, the Phantom Stranger gathered a large group of magic wielders in an unsuccessful attempt to solicit the Spectre's assistance in the Crisis.

In the Madame Xanadu series, the first encounter between the then-young and innocent Nimue, as Xanadu was known in the Arthurian Age, and the Phantom Stranger himself is told. There, Nimue acknowledges his unearthly nature, describing him as "Ageless and yet so...uneasy", and claiming, "You're not human! Nor are you of the Ancient Folk! Nor fey creature. Nor...nor demon..." Before Nimue is able to grasp his nature, the Stranger goes away, claiming to be "compelled to counsel and yet forbidden to interfere in the course of history".

In the pages of Shadowpact, the Phantom Stranger has adopted the role of narrator. He is shown to be aware of the mystical happenings, not only on Earth, but across several dimensions; once again he is shown to be unable to interfere, no matter how dire the danger that he is aware of may be.

Blackest Night 
In Blackest Night #2, Black Hand refers to the Phantom Stranger as neither dead nor alive, meaning he cannot be killed, resurrected or raised as a Black Lantern. The Stranger watches as a black power ring attaches itself to Crispus Allen's body, turning him into a Black Lantern, and sealing the Spectre within him. In the tie-in one-shot revival of Phantom Stranger #42, the Stranger, with the help of Blue Devil, attempts to fight the Black Lantern Spectre, but fails. The two then travel to Nanda Parbat, where the Stranger helps Deadman remove the black ring from his body. The Stranger has the body brought into Nanda Parbat and placed under guard, stating that it is of "singular importance".

The New 52
In DC Comics - The New 52 FCBD Special Edition #1 as part of The New 52 (a reboot of the DC Comics universe), the Phantom Stranger was implied to be Judas Iscariot and part of the Trinity of Sin with Pandora and the Question. While not named explicitly, the necklace he wears is presumed to be made from the 30 pieces of silver that he received for his betrayal of Jesus Christ. His hair and eyes become totally white from the experience.

In Phantom Stranger (vol. 4) #0, it is confirmed that Phantom Stranger was once known as Judas Iscariot, the man who betrayed Jesus. In this origin tale he is about to hang himself when his suicide attempt is stopped by a mysterious group of individuals. He is subsequently judged along with Pandora of Pandora's Box fame and another man who was turned into the Question. Thousands of years later, he is guided to help desperate former detective Jim Corrigan find his kidnapped girlfriend. He leads him to the abandoned warehouse where she has been kept, but this turns out to be a trap. Corrigan is killed by the kidnappers, then transforms into the Spectre and accuses the Stranger of betraying him. As the Spectre is about to attack the Stranger, a mysterious Voice sends him off to inflict his wrath on the more deserving. As payment for what occurred with Corrigan, one coin drops off the necklace he was cursed with (made of the 30 pieces of silver he betrayed Jesus for) and the Stranger realizes he has more encounters ahead of him before he is forgiven.

Pandora meets the Phantom Stranger and tells him she needs his help to find the person who can open her box. He refuses, reminding her of the last time the box was opened, when the sins of the world were unleashed. To this, she responds that she only wants to save everyone from what she unleashed. John Constantine tries to con the Phantom Stranger to join the Justice League Dark by promising to return one of the 30 silver coins bound to him through his punishment. The Phantom Stranger rejects the offer, but Constantine feels he will eventually come around and be on the Justice League Dark's side. The Question manipulates Doctor Thirteen to impale the Phantom Stranger with the Spear of Destiny. The Phantom Stranger is left on the door to the House of Mystery, and the Justice League Dark attempt to revive him, summoning the Nightmare Nurse. Once they do revive him, the Phantom Stranger states that they are all in his debt and asks the Justice League Dark (specifically Zatanna) to help him enter Hell in order to save his family. Zauriel warns the Phantom Stranger that he is never allowed to enter Heaven again, having gone to Hell to try to save his family. Zauriel also states to the Phantom Stranger that if he tries, he will be erased from time and history forever.

Powers and abilities
The natures of these are as mysterious as the Stranger himself, who seems to be effectively immortal, never aging. The Phantom Stranger has demonstrated enormous powers and capabilities, the exact origin of which is undetermined. He can travel enormous distances in a very short period of time, such as to the JLA Watchtower and Apokolips, as well as to mystical dimensions, such as Heaven, Hell and the realm occupied by the Quintessence (although he is forbidden from entering Heaven directly). He can fire energy bolts of great force, travel through time, dispel magic, reveal illusions, and survive in space without any type of life support system; on one occasion, he created a mystical shield that protected Superman from any spells cast against him directly in preparation for Superman's upcoming confrontation with Arion. The limits of his power have not been defined. In many cases, despite his obvious capabilities, he claims he is not allowed to end a crisis directly, only to guide others to take the necessary actions (this restriction allows the Stranger to guest-star in virtually any title without becoming a deus ex machina, whose actions would immediately end the story).

The Phantom Stranger's greatest and most well-known power is his mysterious omniscience; he seems to know nearly everything about any character and situation he encounters in the DC Universe, and in the JLA/Avengers crossover, this extends to the Marvel Universe as well for the sake of the story; this is, however, disproved in Swamp Thing Annual #2. This allows him to provide helpful advice and assistance to others. He claims that "nothing remains hidden to [him]". His knowledge has even allowed him to come to the aid of DC Universe characters trapped out of their own times. In Animal Man #19, Animal Man had found himself trapped in the 1960s in a ghost-like state in between reality and non-reality. He wandered listlessly, until the Stranger met him and offered a helping hand. The Stranger was already aware of Animal Man's current state of despair, and even knew that he was from the future (i.e. the late 1980s). In Swamp Thing Annual #2, the Stranger was not completely aware of all the details of Alec Holland's transformation into the Swamp Thing; he knew enough to be aware of the swamp creature's existence and life, but was still surprised when he encountered the shade of Alex Holland in Heaven, as he had assumed the creature and Holland to be one and the same.

The Phantom Stranger is one of the few true immortals of the DC Universe, actually incapable of being killed. When attacked by the Spectre in the Day of Vengeance story, the Stranger expresses doubt that even the Spectre could kill him, mysteriously adding that "I doubt the Universe would allow it". The Spectre resorted to transforming the Stranger into a harmless mouse, as killing the Phantom Stranger was indeed beyond even the Spectre's power.

Although the Phantom Stranger does not wear a mask, the shadow of his fedora almost constantly cloaks his eyes. When shown unhatted in the Madame Xanadu miniseries, set in the Arthurian age where the Stranger's disguise was a simple cloak, his eyes appear completely white - devoid of irises and pupils - and sunk in a gaunt, sad visage.

Other versions
 In DC: The New Frontier #6, the Phantom Stranger calls several magic-based heroes to a banquet on the Moon, where he counsels them not to interfere in the new heroes' battle with the Center.
 In Scooby-Doo! Team-Up #13, the Phantom Stranger and Boston Brand recruit Scooby-Doo and Mystery Inc. to solve a mass kidnapping of supernatural beings.

Collected editions
 Showcase Presents: Phantom Stranger Vol. 1 collects Showcase #80 and Phantom Stranger vol. 2 #1-21, 544 pages, October 2006, 
 Showcase Presents: Phantom Stranger Vol. 2 collects Phantom Stranger vol. 2 #22-41, Justice League of America #103, House of Secrets #150, The Brave and the Bold #89, 98 and the Frankenstein stories from Phantom Stranger vol. 2 #23-30, 552 pages, March 2008,  
 Phantom Stranger Omnibus includes Showcase #80, Phantom Stranger vol. 1 #1-6, Phantom Stranger vol. 2 #1-41, Justice League of America #103, House of Secrets #150, The Brave and the Bold #89, 98, 145; backups from The Saga of the Swamp Thing #1-13, DC Super Stars #18, DC Comics Presents #25, 72; Who’s Who: The Definitive Directory of the DC Universe #18; 1,136 pages; May 2022, 
 Blackest Night: Rise of the Black Lanterns includes Phantom Stranger vol. 2 #42, 256 pages, July 2011, 
 Trinity of Sin: Phantom Stranger Vol. 1: A Stranger Among Us collects Phantom Stranger vol. 4 #0-5, 144 pages, June 2013, 
 Trinity of Sin - The Phantom Stranger Vol. 2: Breach of Faith collects Phantom Stranger vol. 4 #6-8 and Trinity of Sin: Phantom Stranger #9-11, 144 pages, March 2014, 
 Trinity of Sin - Phantom Stranger Vol. 3: The Crack in Creation collects Trinity of Sin: Phantom Stranger #12-22 and Trinity of Sin: Futures End #1, 264 pages, January 2015,

In other media

Television
 The Phantom Stranger appears in the Batman: The Brave and the Bold episode "Chill of the Night!", voiced by Kevin Conroy.
 The Phantom Stranger appears in Swamp Thing, portrayed by Macon Blair.
 The Phantom Stranger appears in the Young Justice episode "Odnu!", voiced by D. B. Woodside.

Film
The Phantom Stranger appears in DC Showcase: The Phantom Stranger, voiced by Peter Serafinowicz.

Video games
 The Phantom Stranger appears as a non-playable character in DC Universe Online.
 The Phantom Stranger appears as a non-playable character in DC Legends.

Music
The song "Return of the Phantom Stranger" appears on Rob Zombie's Hellbilly Deluxe (1998) album.

Miscellaneous
 Bruce Timm had intended to utilize the Phantom Stranger in the DC Animated Universe, but was not allowed to do so. Despite this, Timm's design for the character appears in Batman: Gotham Adventures #33, Justice League Adventures #31, and Justice League Unlimited #14 and #28, 
 The Phantom Stranger appears in the novel DC Universe: Trail of Time, by Jeff Mariotte.

References

External links
 
 
 
 
 Index to the Phantom Stranger's Earth-1 adventures
 The Unofficial Phantom Stranger Chronology
 Phantom Stranger vol. 2 cover gallery
 Phantom Stranger FAQ

1952 comics debuts
1953 comics endings
1969 comics debuts
1976 comics endings
Characters created by Carmine Infantino
Characters created by John Broome
Comics by Arnold Drake
Comics by Gerry Conway
Comics by J. M. DeMatteis
Comics by Len Wein
Comics by Paul Kupperberg
Comics by Robert Kanigher
Comics characters introduced in 1952
Comics magazines published in the United States
Cultural depictions of Judas Iscariot
DC Comics American superheroes
DC Comics characters who use magic
DC Comics characters who can teleport 
DC Comics fantasy characters
DC Comics male superheroes
DC Comics titles
Fictional characters who can manipulate time
Fictional characters with anti-magic or power negation abilities
Defunct American comics
Mythology in DC Comics
Vertigo Comics characters
Vertigo Comics titles